"Dreamin'" is a 1977 disco single by Loleatta Holloway and The Salsoul Orchestra. The song was written by Allan Felder, Norman Harris, Ron Tyson. The single was a track from the album Loleatta and along with the tracks "Hit and Run" and "Ripped Off", went to #3 on the disco chart.  "Dreamin'" also peaked at #72 on the Hot 100, and was the B-side to her ballad, "Worn Out Broken Heart", which went to number #25 on the soul chart.

2000 recording
In 2000, a new remixed version of "Dreamin'" was recorded by Holloway, this version went to number one on the dance charts.

See also
 List of number-one dance singles of 2000 (U.S.)

References 

1977 singles
1977 songs
2000 singles
Loleatta Holloway songs
Songs written by Allan Felder
Songs written by Norman Harris (musician)